This is a list of the mammal species recorded in Puerto Rico. These are the mammal species in Puerto Rico, of which one is critically endangered, none are endangered, two are vulnerable, and none are near threatened. Two of the species listed for Puerto Rico are considered to be extinct.

The following tags are used to highlight each species' conservation status as assessed by the International Union for Conservation of Nature:

Some species were assessed using an earlier set of criteria. Species assessed using this system have the following instead of near threatened and least concern categories:

Order: Sirenia (manatees and dugongs) 

Sirenia is an order of fully aquatic, herbivorous mammals that inhabit rivers, estuaries, coastal marine waters, swamps, and marine wetlands. All four species are endangered.

Family: Trichechidae
Genus: Trichechus
 West Indian manatee, T. manatus

Order: Rodentia (rodents) 
Rodents make up the largest order of mammals, with over 40% of mammalian species. They have two incisors in the upper and lower jaw which grow continually and must be kept short by gnawing.

Suborder: Hystricomorpha
Family: Echimyidae
Subfamily: Heteropsomyinae
Genus: Heteropsomys
 Insular cave rat, H. insulans  
Subfamily: Isolobodontinae
Genus: Isolobodon
 Puerto Rican hutia, I. portoricensis  introduced
Suborder: Muridae
Family: Muridae
Genus: Mus
 House mouse, M. musculus  introduced
Genus: Rattus
 Brown rat, R. norvegicus  introduced
 Black rat, R. rattus  introduced

Order: Primates

The order Primates includes the lemurs, monkeys, and apes, with the latter category including humans.

Family: Cercopithecidae
Genus: Erythrocebus
 Common patas monkey, E. patas  introduced

Order: Chiroptera (bats) 
The bats' most distinguishing feature is that their forelimbs are developed as wings, making them the only mammals capable of flight. Bat species account for about 20% of all mammals.

Family: Noctilionidae
Genus: Noctilio
 Greater bulldog bat, Noctilio leporinus LR/lc
Family: Vespertilionidae
Subfamily: Vespertilioninae
Genus: Lasiurus
 Eastern red bat, Lasiurus borealis LR/lc
Family: Molossidae
Genus: Molossus
 Velvety free-tailed bat, Molossus molossus LR/lc
Genus: Tadarida
 Mexican free-tailed bat, Tadarida brasiliensis LR/nt
Family: Mormoopidae
Genus: Mormoops
 Antillean ghost-faced bat, Mormoops blainvillii LR/nt
Genus: Pteronotus
 Parnell's mustached bat, Pteronotus parnellii LR/lc
 Sooty mustached bat, Pteronotus quadridens LR/nt
Family: Phyllostomidae
Subfamily: Phyllostominae
Genus: Macrotus
 Waterhouse's leaf-nosed bat, Macrotus waterhousii extirpated LR/lc
Subfamily: Brachyphyllinae
Genus: Brachyphylla
 Antillean fruit-eating bat, Brachyphylla cavernarum LR/lc
Subfamily: Phyllonycterinae
Genus: Phyllonycteris
 Puerto Rican flower bat, Phyllonycteris major EX
Subfamily: Glossophaginae
Genus: Monophyllus
Insular single leaf bat, Monophyllus plethodon LC possibly extirpated
Puerto Rican long-nosed bat, M. p. prater 
 Leach's single leaf bat, Monophyllus redmani LR/lc
Subfamily: Stenodermatinae
Genus: Artibeus
 Jamaican fruit bat, Artibeus jamaicensis LR/lc
Genus: Stenoderma
 Red fruit bat, Stenoderma rufum VU

Order: Cetacea (whales) 

The order Cetacea includes whales, dolphins and porpoises. They are the mammals most fully adapted to aquatic life with a spindle-shaped nearly hairless body, protected by a thick layer of blubber, and forelimbs and tail modified to provide propulsion underwater.

Suborder: Mysticeti
Family: Balaenopteridae (baleen whales)
Genus: Balaenoptera 
 Common minke whale, Balaenoptera acutorostrata
 Sei whale, Balaenoptera borealis
 Bryde's whale, Balaenoptera brydei
 Blue whale, Balaenoptera musculus
Genus: Megaptera
 Humpback whale, Megaptera novaeangliae
Suborder: Odontoceti
Superfamily: Platanistoidea
Family: Delphinidae (marine dolphins)
Genus: Delphinus
 Short-beaked common dolphin, Delphinus delphis DD
Genus: Feresa
 Pygmy killer whale, Feresa attenuata DD
Genus: Globicephala
 Short-finned pilot whale, Globicephala macrorhynchus DD
Genus: Lagenodelphis
 Fraser's dolphin, Lagenodelphis hosei DD
Genus: Grampus
 Risso's dolphin, Grampus griseus DD
Genus: Orcinus
 Killer whale, Orcinus orca DD
Genus: Peponocephala
 Melon-headed whale, Peponocephala electra DD
Genus: Pseudorca
 False killer whale, Pseudorca crassidens DD
Genus: Stenella
 Pantropical spotted dolphin, Stenella attenuata DD
 Clymene dolphin, Stenella clymene DD
 Striped dolphin, Stenella coeruleoalba DD
 Atlantic spotted dolphin, Stenella frontalis DD
 Spinner dolphin, Stenella longirostris DD
Genus: Steno
 Rough-toothed dolphin, Steno bredanensis DD
Genus: Tursiops
 Common bottlenose dolphin, Tursiops truncatus
Family: Physeteridae (sperm whales)
Genus: Physeter
 Sperm whale, Physeter catodon DD
Family: Kogiidae (dwarf sperm whales)
Genus: Kogia
 Pygmy sperm whale, Kogia breviceps DD
 Dwarf sperm whale, Kogia sima DD
Superfamily Ziphioidea
Family: Ziphidae (beaked whales)
Genus: Mesoplodon
 Gervais' beaked whale, Mesoplodon europaeus DD
 Blainville's beaked whale, Mesoplodon densirostris DD
 True's beaked whale, Mesoplodon mirus DD
Genus: Ziphius
 Cuvier's beaked whale, Ziphius cavirostris DD

Order: Carnivora (carnivorans) 
There are over 260 species of carnivorans, the majority of which feed primarily on meat. They have a characteristic skull shape and dentition. 
Family: Herpestidae
Genus: Urva
 Small Indian mongoose, U. auropunctata  introduced
Suborder: Pinnipedia
Family: Phocidae (earless seals)
Genus: Cystophora
 Hooded seal, C. cristata  vagrant
Genus: Neomonachus
Caribbean monk seal, N. tropicalis

Order: Artiodactyla (even-toed ungulates) 

The even-toed ungulates are ungulates – hoofed animals – which bear weight equally on two (an even number) of their five toes: the third and fourth. The other three toes are either present, absent, vestigial, or pointing posteriorly.
Family: Cervidae
Subfamily: Capreolinae
Genus: Odocoileus
 White-tailed deer, O. virginianus  introduced

See also

List of chordate orders
Lists of mammals by region
List of prehistoric mammals
Mammal classification
List of mammals described in the 2000s

Notes

References
 

Puerto Rico
Mammals

Puerto Rico